Elizabeth Concordia is the CEO and President of UCHealth. In her position she manages the University of Colorado Hospital Authority and Poudre Valley Health System.

Previously she was the first female CEO of the University of Pittsburgh Medical Center Presbyterian Shadyside Hospital.

Concordia holds a Bachelor of Arts in Economics and German from Duke University and a Master of Administrative Science Management from Johns Hopkins University.

References

External links
video interview with Elizabeth Concordia on healthcare

Living people
University of Colorado people
Year of birth missing (living people)